Homaloxestis baibaraensis is a moth in the family Lecithoceridae first described by Kyu-Tek Park in 1999. It is found in Taiwan.

The wingspan is 15.5 mm. The forewings are light brown, speckled with brown scales throughout. The discal spot is absent.

Etymology
The species name is derived from the type locality, Baibara.

References

Moths described in 1999
Homaloxestis